Archives is a compilation album by Darkest Hour, released on October 3, 2006 through A-F Records.

The disc includes tracks from the band's first two independent EPs, 1996's The Misanthrope and 1999's The Prophecy Fulfilled. The audio for this release was re-mastered from the original master tapes.

Tracks 1 to 6 are from The Prophecy Fulfilled, track 10 and is from a split EP with Groundzero, and tracks 11 to 16 are from The Misanthrope. Tracks 7 to 9 are alternate versions of songs from The Prophecy Fullfilled.

Track listing

Personnel
John Henry – vocals
Mike Schleibaum – guitar
Fred Ziomek – lead guitar (tracks 9 and 10)
Billups Allen – bass (tracks 1 to 10)
Raul Mayorga – bass (tracks 11 to 16)
Matt Mabben – drums (tracks 1 to 8, 10 to 16)
Ryan Parrish – drums (track 9)

References

2006 compilation albums
Darkest Hour (band) compilation albums
A-F Records albums
Albums with cover art by Aaron Turner